The Rivers State Ministry of Justice is a ministry of the Government of Rivers State responsible for handling and coordinating matters relating to judicial administration. The headquarters of the ministry is located at the State Secretariat in Port Harcourt. The current Attorney-General and Commissioner for Justice is Prof. Zacchaeus Adangor, SAN, MCIArb, appointed in 2018.

See also
Government of Rivers State
Judiciary of Rivers State

References

External links
Judiciary of Rivers State website

Justice
Justice ministries
Rivers State